Drusenheim ( or ) is a commune in the Bas-Rhin département in Grand Est in north-eastern France, situated on the bank of the Rhine.

History
Drusenheim was fortified by the military architect,  militaire Jean Maximilien Welsch in 1705.

Population

Notable people
 Roland Wagner (born 1955), former football international

See also
Communes of the Bas-Rhin department

References

Communes of Bas-Rhin